Bucky may refer to:

As a nickname
 William Bucky Baxter (1955–2020), American multi-instrumentalist from New Jersey
 Arlen Bucky Bockhorn (born 1933), retired American basketball player
 Darrell Bucky Brandon (born 1940), American former Major League Baseball player
 Morris Bucky Buckwalter (born 1933), American former National Basketball Association coach and executive
 William Bucky Covington (born 1977), American country music singer
 Ernest Bucky Curtis Jr. (born c. 1929), American football player for Vanderbilt University
 Russell Bucky Dent (born 1951), American former Major League Baseball player
 Richard Buckminster Fuller (1895–1983), American architect, author, designer and inventor
 Clark Bucky Halker (born 1954), American academic, music historian, labor activist, singer and songwriter 
 Stanley Bucky Harris (1896–1977), American Major League Baseball player, manager, and executive
 Temuchin Bucky Hodges (born 1995), American football tight end for the New York Jets
 Gordon Bucky Hollingworth (1933–1974), Canadian ice hockey defenceman 
 Newton Bucky Jacobs (1913–1990), American Major League Baseball pitcher
 Larry Bucky Jacobsen (born 1975), American former Major League Baseball player
 Charles Bucky Lasek (born 1972), American professional skateboarder and rallycross driver
 Paul Bucky McConnell (born 1928), American former professional basketball player
 William McCullough (loyalist) (1949–1981), Northern Irish paramilitary
 Harris McGalliard (born 1906), better known as Bucky Harris, American professional baseball player
 William Bucky Moore (1905-1980), American National Football League player
 Frank Bucky O'Connor (1913–1958), college men's basketball coach
 Ralph "Bucky" Phillips (born 1962), American convicted murderer
 John Bucky Pizzarelli (1926–2020), American jazz guitarist
 Frank Bucky Pope (born 1941), American former National Football League player
 William Bucky Scribner (1960–2017), American punter
 Frederick Bucky Veil (1881–1931), Major League Baseball player
 Raymond Bucky Waters (born 1935), American basketball broadcaster
 Wallace Bucky Williams (1906–2009), Negro league baseball player

Fictional characters
 Bucky (Marvel Comics), several fictional characters in the Marvel Comics universe
 Bucky, a squirrel from The Emperor's New Groove franchise
 Bucky, the ship from the show Jake and the Never Land Pirates
 Bucky, the protagonist of the manga Jibaku-kun
 Bucky Buenaventura, a character from The Zeta Project
 Bucky Katt, a character from the comic strip Get Fuzzy
 Bucky McBadBat, on the television show The Fairly OddParents
Bucky O'Hare, comic book and television show character

Mascots
 Bucky Badger, the official mascot of the University of Wisconsin–Madison
 Bucky (mascot), the mascot of the East Tennessee State Buccaneers

Other uses
 Gustav Peter Bucky (1880–1963), German-American radiologist who made early contributions to X-ray technique
 Bucky (Tyrannosaurus rex), a dinosaur specimen
 Bucky, a nickname for Buckfast Tonic Wine, a wine made in England
 Part of an X-ray generator that holds film

See also

 Buckey (disambiguation)
 Buck (disambiguation)
 Buck (nickname)
 Buckie, a town in Scotland
 Buckyball (disambiguation)
 Bucky bit, a type of bit in computing
 Buc-ee's, a convenience store

Lists of people by nickname